Miles Davis, Vol. 3 (BLP 5040) is the sixth studio album by musician Miles Davis. It was released in 1954, as a 10 inch LP album. It consists of the third and last of three sessions recorded for Blue Note Records. Several years later, Davis would once again record at Blue Note, but as a sideman on Cannonball Adderley's Somethin' Else (BLP 1595).

The  six tracks were recorded at Rudy Van Gelder's Studio, Hackensack, New Jersey, on March 6, 1954. For the session he used exactly the same quartet he would again record with seven days later for side 2 of the Miles Davis Quartet LP (PRLP 161), released by Prestige. Davis says in his autobiography that these were his first recording sessions after successfully quitting his heroin habit, and that he arranged them both quickly as he needed money fast, and both Blue Note's Alfred Lion and Prestige's Bob Weinstock had given him a fair chance earlier when his reputation was in decline. This was also the first of several sessions Davis would record with the young Horace Silver, whom he liked for his funky style of playing.

After the 10" LP format was discontinued, the tracks would all reappear on the 12" album version of Miles Davis Volume 2 (BLP 1502), alongside tracks from Davis' first two Blue Note sessions. In the CD era all six tracks would be reassigned to the CD version of Miles Davis Volume 1.

Track listing

Personnel
 Miles Davis – trumpet
 Horace Silver – piano
 Percy Heath – bass
 Art Blakey – drums

References

1954 albums
Miles Davis albums
Blue Note Records albums
Albums produced by Alfred Lion
Albums recorded at Van Gelder Studio